The Ninth Cloud (also known under the working titles Bob's Not Gay, Men Don't Lie, and Cloud Nine) is a 2014 independent comedy-drama film directed by Jane Spencer. The film stars Megan Maczko as Zena, a dreamy young woman that falls in love with an American expatriate.

Synopsis
Zena is a beautiful vulnerable young London woman that goes through her life in a dream-like haze. She falls in love with an American expatriate aspiring theatre director, whom she idolizes as perfect.

Cast 
 Megan Maczko as Zena
 Michael Madsen as Bob
 Jean-Hugues Anglade as Jonny
 Meredith Ostrom as Miriam
 Elodie Betrisey as Bumble
 Ian Webster as Guy Wordsworth
 Wendy Thomas as Gemma
 Gabrielle Ryan as Princess Mariba

Production
Plans to film The Ninth Cloud (then titled Bob's Not Gay) were announced in 2006. The following year William Baldwin, Irène Jacob, and Julia Jentsch signed on to perform in the film, and filming was slated to begin May 2007 in Bucharest. Financial difficulties delayed shooting and the film's working title and star lineup changed several times.  Actor Guillaume Depardieu was at one point attached to the movie but Spencer was forced to recast after Depardieu died in 2008. After casting Madsen and Maczko, Spencer began and completed principal shooting in 2011 and the film was in post production in 2012 and 2013.

References

External links 
 
 

2014 comedy-drama films
Films set in London
British comedy-drama films
2014 comedy films
2010s English-language films
2010s British films